Mount Burnett is a hill in Kahurangi National Park, in Golden Bay / Mohua, New Zealand.

Location
Mount Burnett has given its name to the Burnett Range, the range that forms the north-west border of the valley in which the Aorere River flows. The locality at the foot of Mount Burnett on the Aorere River flats is known as Ferntown. The nearest sizeable settlement is Collingwood to the south-east of Mount Burnett.

Geography
The mountain hosts an unusual geography, and a number of species of shrubs and sedge are endemic to this mountain, and it is host to a large population of the critically endangered Powelliphanta gilliesi gilliesi subspecies of giant land snails.

Geology and mining
Geological surveys by European colonists identified the presence of the raw materials needed for hydraulic cement in Golden Bay / Mohua. In 1882, a cement works was established in Ferntown. This was done by the company that operated the coal mine at Mount Burnett. In the following year, the company imported machinery for the large-scale production of Portland cement but soon afterwards, it ran out of capital and the cement production was stopped.

Mount Burnett is home to an open cast dolomite mine, operated by Sollys Transport a local Golden Bay company. The Mount Burnett dolomite mine is the only source of the mineral, an important agricultural fertiliser, in New Zealand. The mine employs about 20 people. Some of the dolomite is shipped via Port Tarakohe. An extension to the mine was declined by the Minister for Conservation, Chris Carter in 2004. Mining is opposed by environmental groups including Forest & Bird.

Footnotes

References

Burnett
Burnett
Golden Bay